Eragrostis parviflora is a widespread species of grass known as weeping lovegrass. Growing to  metres tall, it may be found in many parts of Australia and New Caledonia. Leaves are strongly ribbed, hairless or with marginal hairs; the leaf blade may be flat or inrolled.

References

parviflora
Flora of Australia
Flora of New Caledonia
Poales of Australia
Plants described in 1830